Igor Koliev (born 30 November 1967) is a Belarusian judoka.

Achievements

References
 

1967 births
Living people
Belarusian male judoka
Universiade medalists in judo
Universiade bronze medalists for Belarus
Place of birth missing (living people)
20th-century Belarusian people